Manistique Lake, locally called Big Manistique Lake to distinguish it from the other lakes in the Manistique Lakes system, is a  lake in the Upper Peninsula of the U.S. state of Michigan.

The lake is shared between Luce County and Mackinac County.  The small town of Curtis, Michigan is located on an isthmus that divides Manistique Lake from South Manistique Lake directly to the south.

Manistique Lake has at least three islands large enough to show up on maps - Burnt Island near the eastern shore, Foster Island near the northern shore, and Greenfield Island near the center of the lake.

Many seasonal residents use Manistique Lake as a focus of summer recreational activity.  The relatively shallow lake is favored for swimming, powerboating, personal watercraft, fishing, ice fishing, and camping.  The Michigan Department of Natural Resources (MDNR) recommends the lake for fishing and boating.  Fish caught in the lake include bluegill, largemouth bass, muskie, perch, northern pike, rock bass, smallmouth bass, sunfish, and walleye.

See also
List of lakes in Michigan

References

Lakes of Michigan
Bodies of water of Luce County, Michigan
Bodies of water of Mackinac County, Michigan